Demister may refer to:
 Demister (SCUBA), a product used to clear a scuba mask of fog
 Demister (vapor), a device that removes entrained liquid droplets from a gas stream
 Defogger or demister, a heating device fitted to rear windows of modern automobiles